Venkata Rao or Venkatarao is the name of several people from India:

 Venkata Rao III (1892–1927), Indian ruler of the princely state of Sandur
 Aluru Venkata Rao (1880–1964), Indian leader in the Karnataka Ekikarana movement
 Kala Venkata Rao (1900–1959), Indian freedom fighter and politician in Andhra Pradesh
 Yadlapati Venkatarao (1919–), Ex-Minister, Former Rajyasabha MP and politician in Andhra Pradesh
 Chellapilla Venkata Rao (1910–1971), Indian botanist
 Kavikondala Venkata Rao (1892–1969), Indian writer in the Telugu language from Andhra Pradesh
 R. Venkata Rao (died 1843), Indian administrator and statesman who served as Diwan of Travancore 1821–29 and 1838–39
 Venkata Ranga Rao (1862–1921), Indian landlord and zamindar
 Reddy Row, also known as Venkata Row, Diwan of Travancore 1817–21 and 1843–45